This is a list of government security police and bodyguard organizations.

Albania
Republican Guard (Albania)

Austria
Bundeskriminalamt
Bundespolizei
EKO Cobra

Bangladesh

 Special Security Force
 President Guard Regiment
 Special Security and Protection Battalion
 Special Branch
 Ansar Guard Battalion

Belarus 

 Belarusian Presidential Security Service

Brazil
Brazilian Federal Police
Municipal Guards

Bulgaria

National Protection Service

Canada

 Royal Canadian Mounted Police
Parliamentary Protective Service
Alberta Sheriffs Branch
High Sheriff of Newfoundland and Labrador

Chile

 Palace Guard and Presidential Escort of Carabineros de Chile

China

 Central Security Bureau of the Chinese Communist Party
 People's Armed Police

Czech Republic

 Útvar pro ochranu prezidenta České republiky  
 Ochranná služba Policie České republiky

Denmark 

Politiets Efterretningstjeneste

Finland
Dignitary Protection Service, Helsinki Police Department

France
Groupe de sécurité de la présidence de la République
Service de Protection des Hautes Personnalités
French Republican Guard

Georgia

Special State Protection Service

Germany 

 Bundespolizei
 GSG 9
 Landespolizei
 Bundeskriminalamt
 Sicherungsgruppe (SG)
 Missions Abroad and Special Operations Unit

Hong Kong

VIP Protection Unit

Hungary 

 Counter Terrorism Centre (TEK – Terrorelhárítási Központ) 
 Készenléti Rendőrség (Operational Police)

India 

 Special Protection Group

Indonesia 

 Presidential Security Force (Paspampres)

Ireland
Garda Síochána Crime & Security Branch (CSB)
Special Detective Unit (SDU) 
Emergency Response Unit (ERU)
Defence Forces Army Ranger Wing (ARW)

Israel

 Knesset Guard
 Shin Bet

Italy

 Corazzieri

Japan

 Imperial Guard of Japan
 Security Police

Monaco

Compagnie des Carabiniers du Prince

Nigeria

State Security Service

Norway

 Hans Majestet Kongens Garde (HMKG) (His Majesty The King's Guard)
 Den Kongelige Politieskorte (The Royal Police Escort)
 Politiets Sikkerhetstjeneste (PST)

New Zealand

 Diplomatic Protection Squad

North Korea
 Supreme Guard Command
 Ministry of State Security (Partially)

Philippines

Senate of the Philippines
Office of the Sergeant-at-Arms
Security Enforcement Service
Armed Forces of the Philippines
Presidential Security Group
Philippine Marine Corps
Marine Security and Escort Group
Philippine National Police
Police Security and Protection Group

Poland
Służba Ochrony Państwa
Żandarmeria Wojskowa

Portugal

Public Security Police

Romania

Serviciul de Protecţie şi Pază

Russia

Federal Protective Service
Ministry of Internal Affairs (Russia)
GRU
Federal Security Service (Russia)

Serbia 
Law enforcement
Serbian Police Department for Security 
Military
Cobras MP

Slovenia

 Slovenian Police – Security and Protection Office

Sri Lanka

Sri Lanka Army
President's Guard
Commando Regiment
 Sri Lanka Police Service
 President's Security Division
 Prime Minister's Security Division
 Special Task Force

South Korea

 Presidential Security Service

Spain

 Spanish Royal Guard
 Department of Security of the Presidency of the Government

Sweden

 SÄPO (Säkerhetspolisen)

Thailand

 Royal Security Command – Militarised royal guards under the Monarchy of Thailand.
  Royal Thai Aide-De-Camp Department – A division within the command that provides personal protective security to the royal family.
 King's Guard – Ceremonial distinction given to various units in the armed forces.
 Special Branch Bureau – Personal protective security to members of the Royal Thai Government.

Turkey
 General Directorate of Security
 Police Counter Attack Team
 Presidential Guard Regiment

Ukraine

 State Security Administration (Ukraine)

United Kingdom

 Civil Nuclear Constabulary
 Metropolitan Police Service
 Protection Command
 Ministry of Defence Police

 Northern Ireland Security Guard Service
 Royal Military Police Close Protection Unit

United States 

 Department of Homeland Security
 Secret Service
 Federal Air Marshal Service
 Federal Protective Service
 Coast Guard Investigative Service
 Department of State
Diplomatic Security Service (DSS) 
 Department of Justice
 Marshals Service
 FBI Police
 Department of Defense
 Air Force Office of Special Investigations
 Army Criminal Investigation Command
 Defense Criminal Investigative Service
 Naval Criminal Investigative Service
 Pentagon Force Protection Agency
 Department of the Treasury 
Mint Police
 Department of Veterans Affairs
Veterans Affairs Police
 Department of the Interior
Park Police
National Zoological Park Police
United States Postal Service
Postal Inspection Service
 Congress of the United States
 Capitol Police
other
District of Columbia Protective Services Division
Amtrak Police
Supreme Court Police

Vatican 

 Swiss Guard

Vietnam 
Ministry of Public Security (Bộ Công an) - High Command of Protective Guard of Vietnam (Bộ Tư lệnh Cảnh vệ Việt Nam)

Historical

 Roman Empire
Praetorian Guard
Jovians and Herculians

 Byzantine Empire
Varangian Guard

 Ottoman Empire
Janissaries

 Egypt
Ghilman

 First French Empire
Imperial Guard (Napoleon I)

 Second French Empire
Imperial Guard (Napoleon III)

 Nazi Germany
Schutzstaffel (SS)

 Hungary
 :hu:Köztársasági Őrezred Until 1 July 2012 
 BM Kormányőrség from 1957 to 1990
 Magyar Királyi Testõrség from 1920 to 1945

 Austria-Hungary
 Magyar Királyi Darabont Testőrség from 1904 to 1918
 cs. kir. csendőr-testőrség (Leibgarde-Gendarmerie) 1850–1918
 Magyar Királyi Nemes Testőrség from 1760 to 1850

 Iraq
 Republican Guard

 Japan
Shinsengumi

 Achaemenid Empire
 Persian Immortals

 Iran under the Pahlavi dynasty
 Iranian Imperial Guard

 Polish–Lithuanian Commonwealth
 Gwardia Piesza Koronna

 Second Polish Republic
Kompania Zamkowa 1926–1939

 Poland
Biuro Ochrony Rządu 1956–2018

 Russia
 Russian Imperial Guard

 Great Britain
 Royal Horse Guards

See also

Border guard
Coast guard
Home guard
Imperial guard
List of intelligence agencies
List of law enforcement agencies
List of secret police organizations
National Guard
Republican guard
Royal guard
State defense force

References 

 
Lists by country
 
Lists of government agencies
Lists of law enforcement agencies